Patient Grissel is a play by Thomas Dekker, Henry Chettle, and William Haughton, first printed in 1603. It is mentioned in Henslowe's diary in the entry for December 1599.

The plot is a variant of the medieval tale of Patient Griselda, as told in Chaucer's Canterbury Tales and Boccaccio's Decameron.

The play contains Dekker's poem "Golden Slumbers" (which was adapted by Paul McCartney for the song of the same title on The Beatles' Abbey Road album):Golden slumbers kiss your eyes,
Smiles awake you when you rise.
Sleep, pretty wantons; do not cry,
And I will sing a lullaby:
Rock them, rock them, lullaby.

Care is heavy, therefore sleep you;
You are care, and care must keep you;
Sleep, pretty wantons; do not cry,
And I will sing a lullaby:
Rock them, rock them, lullaby.

References

1590s plays
Plays by Thomas Dekker (writer)